Anthony Murray (born 27 May 1977) is an English former professional rugby league footballer who played in the 1990s and 2000s, and has coached in the 2010s. He played at club level for Warrington Wolves, making one appearance in 1997's Super League II, Widnes Vikings, Leigh Centurions, Oldham, Barrow Raiders and Lancashire Lynx, as a hooker, and has coached at club level initially at amateur level, then Barrow Raiders, and is currently the head coach at Workington Town.

Coaching career
Murray was appointed as head coach at Barrow Raiders at the end of the 2013 season, but resigned from the position after four games in the 2014 season due to work commitments. In June 2014, he became head coach at North Wales Crusaders.

In September 2022, he was announced as the head-coach of Workington Town, following the departure of Chris Thorman.

References

External links

1977 births
Living people
Barrow Raiders coaches
Barrow Raiders players
Chorley Lynx players
English rugby league coaches
English rugby league players
Leigh Leopards players
North Wales Crusaders coaches
Oldham R.L.F.C. players
Rochdale Hornets players
Rugby league hookers
Rugby league players from Leigh, Greater Manchester
Swinton Lions players
Warrington Wolves players
Widnes Vikings players
Workington Town coaches
Workington Town players